Idan Shriki (born November 30, 1981) is a retired Israeli footballer.

Career

Club
He made his Ashdod debut in the 2003–04 season against Maccabi Netanya after returning from a one-season loan to Maccabi Yavne where he scored a league leading 25 goals. It wasn't until the 2006–07 season that Shriki received considerable playing time and he returned the favor to manager Alon Hazan by scoring eleven goals and adding three assists. Playing behind Yaniv Azran and Shay Holtzman, the threesome accounted for 77% of goals scored by Ashdod.

In July 2011, Shriki signed a two-year contract with Ekstraklasa's record holder for most championships, Górnik Zabrze. On 9 September 2011, he was loaned to his former club F.C. Ashdod until the end of the season.

On 3 July 2012, Shriki signed a three-year contract with Maccabi Netanya. On January 16, 2013, he was loaned to Maccabi Petah Tikva after a very poor half season with Netanya where he only scored 2 league goals in 12 games. He returned the next season to help Netanya win the Liga Leumit and reach the State Cup finals. In January 2015 he was released from his contract with Netanya and moved to Maccabi Kiryat Gat there he had a rather poor season only scoring 5 times in 17 caps.

On 14 June 2015, Shriki signed a one-year deal with Hapoel Ashkelon.

Honours
Toto Cup
Runner-up (3): 2004–05, 2005–06,  2008–09
Liga Leumit
Winner (2): 2012–13, 2013–14
Israel State Cup
Runner-up (1): 2014

References

External links
 
 Profile of Idan Shriki on Dolphinim.com 

1981 births
Living people
Israeli Jews
Israeli footballers
F.C. Ashdod players
Maccabi Yavne F.C. players
Górnik Zabrze players
Maccabi Netanya F.C. players
Maccabi Kiryat Gat F.C. players
Hapoel Ashkelon F.C. players
Hapoel Bnei Lod F.C. players
Hapoel Marmorek F.C. players
Hapoel Ashdod F.C. players
Israeli Premier League players
Liga Leumit players
Israeli expatriate footballers
Expatriate footballers in Poland
Israeli expatriate sportspeople in Poland
Israeli people of Moroccan-Jewish descent
Footballers from Ashdod
Association football forwards